The following squads were named for the 1942 South American Championship that took place in Uruguay.

Argentina
 Sebastián Gualco
 Jorge Alberti
 Héctor Blotto
 Oscar Montañés
 José Salomón
 Víctor Valussi
 Gregorio Esperón
 Juan Ferreyra
 Ángel Perucca
 José Ramos
 Raimundo Sandoval
 Eusebio Videla
 Enrique García
 Juan Carlos Haedo
 Juan Carlos Heredia
 Ángel Laferrara
 Herminio Masantonio
 José Manuel Moreno
 Adolfo Pedernera
 Mario Tossoni

Brazil
 Aymoré Moreira
 Caju
 Begliomini
 Domingos
 Norival
 Osvaldo Gerico
 Afonsinho
 Argemiro
 Brandão
 Dino
 Jaime
 Tim
 Zizinho
 Cláudio Pinho
 Joanino
 Patesko
 Paulo Flôrencio
 Pedro Amorim
 Pipi
 Russo
 Servílio de Jesús
 Sylvio Pirillo

Chile
 Hernán Fernández
 Mario Ibáñez
 Sergio Livingstone
 Roberto Cabrera
 Humberto Roa
 Santiago Salfate
 Manuel Arancibia
 Benito Armingol
 Florencio Barrera
 Guillermo Casanova
 Armando Contreras
 Alfonso Domínguez
 Francisco Las Heras
 Óscar Medina
 José Pastenes
 Carlos Arancibia
 Raúl Pérez
 Fernando Riera
 Guillermo Torres

Ecuador
 Antonio Abril
 Pedro Acevedo
 Vicente Aguirre
 Marino Alcívar
 Enrique Alvarez
 Ernesto Cevallos
 Guillermo Gavilánez
 José Herrera
 Luis Hungria
 José María Jiménez
 Jorge Laurido
 Napoleón Medina
 Luis Antonio Mendoza
 José Luis Mendoza
 José Merino
 José Peralta
 Romualdo Ronquillo
 Manuel Sempértegui
 Celso Torres
 Humberto Vásquez
 Arturo Zambrano
 Félix Leyton Zurita

Paraguay
 Avelino Acosta
 Isidro Alonso
 Ruben Aveiro
 Marcial Barrios
 Fabio Pascual Baudo Franco
 Julián Benegas
 Domingo Benítez
 Castor Cantero
 Martín Carballo
 Isidro Escobar
 Eulalio Granje
 José Ibáñez
 Gorgonio Ibarrola
 Tranquilino Mello
 Eduardo Mingo
 Miguel Ortega
 Dionisio Ríos
 Ignacio Romero
 Lorenzo Romero
 Vicente Sánchez
 Sabino Villalba

Peru
 Diego Agurto
 Antonio Biffi
 Alberto Delgado
 Teodoro Fernández
 Luis Guzmán
 Teobaldo Guzmán
 Juan Honres
 Marcial Hurtado
 Orestes Jordán
 Máximo Lobatón
 Pedro Luna
 Adolfo Magallanes
 Pedro Magán
 Roberto Morales
 Tulio Obando
 Pablo Pasache
 Enrique Perales
 Carlos Portal
 Leopoldo Quiñónez
 Juan Quispe
 Juan Soriano
 Antonio Zegarra

Uruguay
 Anibal Paz
 Agenor Muñiz
 Héctor Romero
 Obdulio Varela
 Schubert Gambetta
 Raúl Rodriguez
 Luis Castro
 Oscar Chirmini
 Aníbal Ciocca
 José María Correa
 Roberto Porta
 Severino Varela
 Bibiano Zapirain

References

Squads
Copa América squads